En vinternat is a 1917 Norwegian crime film written by Peter Lykke-Seest, and directed by Lykke-Seest and Oscar Gustafson, starring Oscar Gustafson, Helen Storm and Moltke Garmann. Wollert Berg (Gustafson) is an author who has retired to his cabin in the woods to write. He offers lodging to a couple of vagrants, but when they steal from the neighbours, Wollert gets accused and convicted. His wife (Storm) then enlists the help of a detective to clear his name.

The film is considered lost.

External links
 
 

1917 films
1917 crime films
Lost Norwegian films
Norwegian silent films
Norwegian black-and-white films
Norwegian crime films
1917 lost films